Pihen is a railway station in Pihen-lès-Guînes, northern France. It is served by the TER Hauts-de-France line between Calais and Rang-du-Fliers.

References

 

Railway stations in Pas-de-Calais